Markoye is a town in northern Burkina Faso, in the province of Oudalan.

Economy
There is a weekly cattle and camel market in the town and it is close to a manganese mine in Tambao.

Transport
It is a station on a proposed phosphate railway.

See also

 Railway stations in Burkina Faso

References

External links 
 Markoye, Under the Acacias

Populated places in the Centre-Nord Region